Pensi-la (Pensi Pass) is a mountain pass in the Ladakh union territory of India, which is known as the Gateway to Zanskar. The pass is about 25 km from Rangdum Monastery.

Geography 

To the west of Pensi La watershed flows the Suru River, an important tributary of the Indus, which it meets at Kargil. The Drang-Drung Glacier on the eastern flank of Pensi La is the source of Stod or Doda River, which flows into the Padum Valley, and joins with Tsarap Chu to form the Zanskar River.

<blockquote>"The descent from the Pensi La into the Stod Valley [in Zanskar] is steeper than the climb up from Rangdum Gompa, but not too difficult. The road winds about with many hairpin turns, which can be cut across on foot, to the river below. Wild rhubarb can be seen growing on the slopes. The generally used trekking route follows the road on the left bank of the Stod (or Doda). . . . The grass at the foot of the Pensi La furnishes a good pasturage and this is a fine camping spot."</p></blockquote> Pensi-La is also the gateway to Padum, the headquarters of Zanskar sub-division of Kargil district.  A 240 km road connecting Kargil town to Padum through the Pensi La is open between May and October.

Before the modern road was built, the pass, apparently, used to be open only three months of the year because of heavy snows.

Footnotes

References

 Janet Rizvi. (1996). Ladakh: Crossroads of High Asia. Second Edition. Oxford University Press, Delhi. .
 Schettler, Margaret & Rolf (1981). Kashmir, Ladakh & Zanskar. Lonely Planet Publications. South Yarra, Victoria, Australia. .

Mountain passes of Ladakh
Geography of Ladakh